Sunday Best is a Canadian documentary television series which aired on CBC Television from 1971 to 1976.

Premise
This mid-season series featured rebroadcasts of CBC documentaries on various subjects, including episodes from Tuesday Night.

Scheduling
This hour-long series was broadcast on Sundays at 4:00 p.m. as follows (times in Eastern):

 11 July 1971 – 12 September 1971
 2 July 1972 – 10 September 1972

 7 Jul 1974 – 8 Sep 1974
 6 Jul 1975 – 7 Sep 1975
 1 Aug 1976 – 29 Aug 1976

References

External links
 

CBC Television original programming
1971 Canadian television series debuts
1976 Canadian television series endings